Rouïba is a district in Algiers Province, Algeria. It was named after its capital, Rouïba.

Municipalities
The district is further divided into 3 municipalities, which is the lowest number in the province:
Rouïba
Reghaïa 
H'raoua

Districts of Algiers Province